USS LST-949/LST(H)-949 was an  in the United States Navy. Like many of her class, she was not named and is properly referred to by her hull designation.

Construction
LST-949 was laid down on 29 August 1944, at Hingham, Massachusetts, by the Bethlehem-Hingham Shipyard; launched on 30 September 1944; and commissioned on  23 October 1944.

Service history
During World War II, LST-949 was assigned to the Asiatic-Pacific theater and participated in the assault and occupation of Okinawa Gunto from April through June 1945.

On 15 September 1945, she was redesignated LST(H)-949 and performed occupation duty in the Far East until mid-April 1946. The tank landing ship was decommissioned on 18 July 1946, and struck from the Navy list on 25 September, that same year. On 30 June 1948, she was sold to the Humble Oil & Refining Co., of Houston, Texas, for operation.

Awards
LST-949 earned one battle star for World War II service.

Notes

Citations

Bibliography 

Online resources

External links
 

 

LST-542-class tank landing ships
World War II amphibious warfare vessels of the United States
Ships built in Hingham, Massachusetts
1944 ships